Outburst may refer to:

 Outburst (comics), a fictional superhero
 Outburst (game), a word game
 Outburst (mining), the sudden and violent ejection of coal, gas and rock from a coal face and surrounding strata in an underground coal mine
 Outbursts (Turin Brakes album), an album by the British folk duo
 Outburst, a sudden release of emotion, commonly a tantrum

See also
 Bursting Out